Lena Kreundl (born 19 December 1997) is an Austrian swimmer. She competed in the women's 200 metre individual medley event at the 2016 Summer Olympics. In 2014, she represented Austria at the 2014 Summer Youth Olympics held in Nanjing, China.

References

External links
 

1997 births
Living people
Austrian female medley swimmers
Olympic swimmers of Austria
Swimmers at the 2016 Summer Olympics
People from Steyr
Swimmers at the 2014 Summer Youth Olympics
Sportspeople from Upper Austria
21st-century Austrian women